Rangrasiya (The One Who Colours Me) is an Indian television drama series that aired on Colors TV from 30 December 2013 to 19 September 2014. It starred Ashish Sharma and Sanaya Irani as Major Rudra Pratap Ranawat and Parvati.

Plot
Parvati, affectionately known as Paro, has pure hatred towards Border Security Force (BSF) officers, holding them responsible for the murder of her parents. She was brought up by  Thakurain Mala, and has consistent nightmares about her parents' deaths. The corrupt Raja Tejawat arranges Paro's wedding with Varun who plans to smuggle weapons across the border during the wedding procession. The procession is disrupted by BSF officers led by Deputy Commandant Rudra Pratap Ranawat and Varun is killed.

An oblivious Parvati blames Rudra for her husband's death. Rudra suspects that she is a material witness and hopes that she will testify. To prevent this, Tejawat hires goons to murder her. Rudra relocates her to his paternal home but when his malicious aunt Mohini insults Parvati's virtue, Rudra's father covers for them and announces she is Rudra's fiance. Eventually, Parvati emotionally sympathizes with Rudra after learning that his mother eloped with another man, unaware that his mother is the Thakurain. On the day of her wedding to Rudra, Parvati chooses to trust Tejawat and flees with him only to discover the truth behind her marriage to Varun. Upon realizing her mistake, she also becomes aware of her love for Rudra and returns to him.

Parvati tries her best to win over Rudra but in vain. He is accused of domestic violence and loses his job after which in a drunken state, he marries Paro. Rudra is reinstated and initially rejects Paro for betraying him but recognizes that he loves her. The couple go through: Rudra recovering from paralysis of his right arm, the interruptions of his ex-girlfriend Laila and their mutual hesitation to confess their love for each other. They eventually unite and confess their feelings.

Thakurain Mala and Rudra meet again but Rudra has pure hatred towards her. Paro tries hard to unite mother and son and is eventually successful. Touched by his efforts to forgive his mother for her, Paro and Rudra finally consummate their marriage. The family is happy till Rudra receives an anonymous call saying that Paro will be killed. For safety, the family relocates. Varun's younger brother, Shanthanu Kumar enters their house as a bodyguard seeking revenge. Parvati finds out and Rudra comes in time to save her. Shanthanu gets arrested. Later on, Parvati becomes pregnant and gives birth to a boy that the couple name Dhruv. Their happiness ends abruptly when Shanthanu escapes from prison and murders Parvati who dies in Rudra's arms. Shantanu is killed by Rudra.

7 Years Later
Rudra lives with his now seven-year-old son, Dhruv and his family. Having quit the BSD, his new assignment is being the bodyguard of Myrah Mehra. Myrah, who is identical in appearance to Parvati, is an NRI and has arrived from the US to pick a venue for her wedding to Rohit Sehgal. Rudra tries to keep his distance from her, in the process becoming hostile. While she is in Rudra's house, Myrah unknowingly falls in love with Rudra and they become friendly. When he rescues her from kidnappers, he recalls how he failed to save Parvati. Under the influence of pain medication Myrah kisses Rudra, who reciprocates, thinking she is Paro, but catches himself just in time.

While Myrah starts to accept her feelings for him, he expresses his frustration over her resemblance to his late wife. Heartbroken, she decides to leave Rudra's life but her fiancé arrives, inspiring jealousy in Rudra. After Myrah helps Maithlee and Samrat adopt a baby, Rudra develops a liking for her. Rudra refuses to confess that he loves Myrah but has a conversation with Paro in a dream where she tells him to move on and be happy. She assures him that she has sent Myrah for him and Dhruv. In a drunken state, Rudra confesses his love to Myrah. She is confused about her feelings for him and chooses to marry Rohit. Rudra writes a letter in which he apologizes for being unable to attend her wedding because he cannot bear the loss. Myrah sends a video that explains her love for Rudra to Rohit, who asks Myrah to pursue it. The show ends with Rudra and Myrah confessing their love and the whole family celebrating.

Cast

Main
Ashish Sharma as [[Deputy 
Commandant]] Rudra Pratap Ranawat: Idealistic Border Security Force Officer; Mala and Dilsher's son; Samrat, Sumer and Sunehri's cousin brother; Parvati's husband; Dhruv's father
Sanaya Irani as Parvati "Paro" Chauhan Ranawat (deceased); Rudra's wife/Myrah Mehra: Parvati's lookalike
Rishi Sonecha/Kapish Chawla as Dhruv Pratap Ranawat: Parvati and Rudra's son

Recurring
Geetanjali Mishra as Maithili Ranawat: Samrat(Rudra's cousin brother)'s wife.
Kali Prasad Mukherjee as Dilsher Pratap Ranawat: Danveer's brother; Mala's husband; Rudra's father
Sadiya Siddiqui as Thakurain Mala Ranawat/Mala Tejawat: Dilsher's wife; Rudra's mother
Sanjiv Jotangia as Danveer Pratap Ranawat: Dilsher's brother; Mohini's husband; Samrat, Sumer and Sunehri's father
Ananya Khare as Mohini Ranawat: Danveer's wife; Samrat, Sumer and Sunehri's mother
Prashant Chawla as Samrat Pratap Ranawat: Mohini and Danveer's elder son; Rudra's cousin brother; Maithili's husband; Sumer and Sunehri's brother.
Udit Shukla as Samay "Sumer" Pratap Ranawat: Mohini and Danveer's younger son; Samrat and Sunehri's brother; Shatabdi's husband
Manasvi Vyas as Shatabdi Ranawat: Sumer's wife
Khushbu Thakkar as Sunehri Ranawat: Mohini and Danveer's daughter; Rudra's cousin sister; Samrat and Sumer's sister
Tarun Khanna as Thakur Param Singh Tejawat: Corrupt 
smuggler
Vishal Gandhi as Varun Kumar Agnihotri: Shantanu's brother; Paro's ex-fiancé
Ahmad Harhash as Ranbir Khan Shantanu Brother Paro,s Sister (2013) (2014)
Padam Bhola as Aman Deep Singh: Rudra's fellow officer at Border Security Defense
Syed Zafar Ali as General Vaman Kumar "VK" Singh: Rudra's superior officer at the Border Security Defense
Neha Narang as Bindiya "Bindi" Parekh: Parvati's friend
Vishal Karwal as Shantanu Kumar Agnihotri: Varun's brother
Ankita Mayank Sharma as Kajal "Laila" Suri: Dancer; Rudra's former companion
 Gurpreet Singh as Rohit Sehgal: Myrah's ex-fiancé

Guest
 Preetika Rao as Aaliya
 Harshad Arora as Zain

Production
The show was shot extensively across arid terrains of Jaisalmer and dunes of Jodhpur. It was inspired by Shakespeare's Othello and the TV show Guns and Roses.

On 31 May 2014, Rangrasiya had a crossover with TV Show, Beintehaa when Rudra and Paro had travelled to Mumbai for the treatment of Rudra's paralysed hand.

Adaptations
It has been dubbed into Malayalam as Pranayavarnangal, in Tamil as Azhagiya Laila ( My Lovely Fiancee) on Raj TV, in Arabic as " Habibi Daiman"  "حبيبي دائما  " English "My Love Forever " and in Turkish as Sensiz Olmaz.

Awards

References

External links 
 
 

Colors TV original programming
2013 Indian television series debuts
2013 Indian television series endings